Grosvenor Place is a street in Belgravia, London, running from Hyde Park Corner down the west side of Buckingham Palace gardens, and joining lower Grosvenor Place where there are some cafes and restaurants. It joins Grosvenor Gardens to the south, which links it to Victoria railway station.  At No. 17 is the Embassy of the Republic of Ireland.

Cleveland Clinic London, the second-largest of 19 private hospitals in the capital, is at no.33.

Notable residents 
Henry Campbell-Bannerman, Prime Minister, No.6
David Rowlands (surgeon), No. 28

References

Streets in the City of Westminster